The Men's Cathay Pacific Hong Kong Open 2016 is the men's edition of the 2016 Hong Kong Open, which is a PSA World Series event Platinum (Prize money: $150,000). The event took place in Hong Kong from 23 August to 28 August. Ramy Ashour won his third Hong Kong Open trophy, beating Karim Abdel Gawad in the final.

Prize money and ranking points
For 2016, the prize purse was $150,000. The prize money and points breakdown is as follows:

Seeds

Draw and results

See also
Hong Kong Open (squash)
2016 Men's World Open Squash Championship
2016–17 PSA World Series

References

Squash tournaments in Hong Kong
Men's Hong Kong Open (squash)
Men's Hong Kong Open (squash)